Adama Diakhaté (born 3 February 1970) is a Senegalese former basketball player who competed in the 2000 Summer Olympics. She was born in Dakar.

References

1970 births
Living people
Basketball players from Dakar
Senegalese women's basketball players
Olympic basketball players of Senegal
Basketball players at the 2000 Summer Olympics
African Games gold medalists for Senegal
African Games medalists in basketball
Competitors at the 2007 All-Africa Games